Otago was a New Zealand parliamentary electorate first created for the , which was replaced by the Waitaki electorate and Clutha-Southland electorates for the . Its last representative was Jacqui Dean of the National Party.

Population centres
The 1977 electoral redistribution was the most overtly political since the Representation Commission had been established through an amendment to the Representation Act in 1886, initiated by Muldoon's National Government. As part of the 1976 census, a large number of people failed to fill out an electoral re-registration card, and census staff had not been given the authority to insist on the card being completed. This had little practical effect for people on the general roll, but it transferred Māori to the general roll if the card was not handed in. Together with a northward shift of New Zealand's population, this resulted in five new electorates having to be created in the upper part of the North Island. The electoral redistribution was very disruptive, and 22 electorates were abolished, while 27 electorates were newly created (including Otago) or re-established.

When the electorate was first formed, it mostly replaced the  electorate, but also gained areas from the  electorate (including Tapanui and Lawrence) and the coastal strip north of Dunedin from the  electorate (including Waikouaiti, Palmerston, and Hampden). The main towns that came from the Otago Central electorate were Queenstown, Alexandra, Cromwell, and Wānaka. In the 1983 electoral redistribution, the southern boundary moved north and some towns transferred to the Clutha electorate, including Tapanui, Lawrence, and Roxburgh. To compensate, some outer suburbs of Dunedin on the northern part of Otago Peninsula were gained from the  electorate, including St Leonards and Ravensbourne.

The electoral redistribution carried out for the 1996 election saw the electorate move further north to now include Twizel.

History
Although Otago was a reasonably safe seat for the National Party, that party's poor showing at the 2002 election saw the Otago constituents elect a Labour MP, David Parker. Three years later in 2005, a swing to National in provincial New Zealand unseated Parker in favour of National's Jacqui Dean. When the Otago electorate was abolished in 2008, Dean transferred to the Waitaki electorate.

Members of Parliament
Key

List MPs
Members of Parliament elected from party lists in elections where that person also unsuccessfully contested the Otago electorate. Unless otherwise stated, all MPs' terms began and ended at general elections.

Election results

2005 election

2002 election

1999 election
Refer to Candidates in the New Zealand general election 1999 by electorate#Otago for a list of candidates.

1987 election

1984 election

1981 election

1978 election

Notes

References

External links
Electorate Profile  Parliamentary Library

Historical electorates of New Zealand
Politics of Otago
1978 establishments in New Zealand
2008 disestablishments in New Zealand